A mindset is a set of assumptions, methods or notions held by one or more people.

Mindset may also refer to:

 Mindset (book), 2006, Carol Dweck, cognitive science
 Mindset (computer), a 1980s personal computer
 Mindset (Transformers), a fictional character
 Mindset (vehicle), a plug-in hybrid
 Mindset (album), a 2011 album by The Necks
 Mind-set, a 2022 film